The National Postal Museum, located opposite Union Station in Washington, D.C., United States, covers large portions of the Postal history of the United States and other countries. It was established through joint agreement between the United States Postal Service and the Smithsonian Institution and opened in 1993.

Premises
The museum is located across the street from Union Station, in the building that served as the main post office of Washington, D.C. for decades, from its construction in 1914 until 1986. The building was designed by the Graham and Burnham architectural firm, which was led by Ernest Graham following the death of Daniel Burnham in 1912.

The headquarters of the United States Department of Labor's Bureau of Labor Statistics is based in this building, and there is also space for a data center for the United States Senate.

Displays
The museum holds the National Philatelic Collection. It has hosted many interactive displays about the history of the United States Postal Service and of mail service around the world. The museum has a gift shop and a United States Postal Service philatelic sales window, along with exhibits on the Pony Express, the use of railroads with the mail, the preserved remains of Owney (the first unofficial postal mascot), and an exhibit on direct marketing called, "What's in the Mail for You." Visitors may acquire a souvenir envelope with their name printed on it and a coupon for the gift shop. As one of the national Smithsonian museums, admission is free. This museum also houses a library.

In 2005, the museum acquired the childhood stamp collection of the late singer/songwriter John Lennon. From June 2015 until December 2018, the museum displayed the 1856 British Guiana One-Cent Magenta, the world's most valuable stamp, which sold for nearly $10 million.

In September 2009, the museum received an $8 million gift from investment firm founder William H. Gross to help finance an expansion project.  The William H. Gross Stamp Gallery of the museum is named in his honor.

Events
Since 2002, the museum has presented the Smithsonian Philatelic Achievement Award every two years.

Gallery

See also
 List of philatelic libraries
 Owney (dog)
 U.S. Postal Museums
 Postal Museum

References

External links 

 
 National Postal Museum Library Official website
 Smithsonian's National Postal Museum at Google Cultural Institute
Arago: People, Postage & the Post

United States Postal Service
Post office buildings on the National Register of Historic Places in Washington, D.C.
Government buildings on the National Register of Historic Places in Washington, D.C.
Members of the Cultural Alliance of Greater Washington
Neoclassical architecture in Washington, D.C.
Philatelic museums in the United States
History museums in Washington, D.C.
Industry museums in Washington, D.C.
Smithsonian Institution museums
Postal history of the United States
United States
1993 establishments in Washington, D.C.
Museums established in 1993